#lovemilla is a Finnish teen television drama. The plot revolves around 17-year-old Milla, who works at Café Robot. Milla and her friends spend their days in a cafeteria of an unnamed small town – a very familiar setting for the target audience in Finland. #lovemilla is a comedic teen drama, but it deals with difficult matters such as drugs, sex and death. Series won the best children's and youth program award at the Kultainen Venla 2013.

#lovemilla is a content series for teenagers, where cross media is thought from the side of audience, not from broadcaster's perspective. The story is told through content pieces that are scattered along social media and TV.

Cast 
Milka Suonpää as Milla Mäntynen
Joel Hirvonen as Aimo
Pauliina Suominen as Siiri
Miina Penttinen as Gootti-Gitta 
Lauri Jokinen as Saku
Teemu Nieminen as Ämpäri
Jouko Puolanto as Roope 
Elina Knihtilä as Pirjo

External links
 Season 1 at Yle Areena
 Season 2 at Yle Areena
 Lovemilla.fi

2010s Finnish television series
Finnish drama television series
Finnish comedy television series
Helsinki in fiction
2013 Finnish television series debuts
Yle original programming